Benzyl isothiocyanate (BITC) is an isothiocyanate found in plants of the mustard family.

Occurrence
It can be found in Alliaria petiolata, pilu oil, and papaya seeds where it is the main product of the glucotropaeolin breakdown by the enzyme myrosinase.

Activity
Benzyl isothiocyanate, and other isothiocyanates in general, were found to be protective against pancreatic carcinogenesis in vitro via expression of the p21/WAF1 gene. A recent published study showed its restraining impact on obesity, fatty liver, and insulin resistance in diet-induced obesity mouse model.

References

Isothiocyanates
Benzyl esters